The National Petrochemical Company (NPC) (Shirkat-e Mili-ye Sânai'-ye Petrushimiy), a subsidiary to the Iranian Petroleum Ministry, is owned by the government of the Islamic Republic of Iran. It is responsible for the development and operation of the country's petrochemical sector. Founded in 1964, NPC began its activities by operating a small fertilizer plant in Shiraz. Today, NPC is the second largest producer and exporter of petrochemicals in the Middle East. Over these years, it has not only expanded the range and volume of its products, but it has also taken steps in areas such as R&D to achieve more self-sufficiency.

Two special economic zones on the northern coast of the Persian Gulf have been developed to be home to the NPC's new project. These two zones enjoy a good access to feedstock, infrastructural facilities, local and international markets and skilled manpower. Despite pressure being exerted on the Islamic Republic over its nuclear program, Tehran expects to see a surge in petrochemical exports from $5.5 billion in 2007 to a total of nearly $9 billion in 2008. The Fourth Five-Year Plan (2005–10) calls for a fourfold expansion of petrochemical output, to 56 million tons per year.

History

Iran petrochemical industry dates back to 1963. The first petrochemical complex to produce fertilizer kicked off then. It was founded by Bagher Mostofi باقر مستوفی under instructions of Shah. In 1977 (considered as initial development in Iran petrochemical industry) Razi, Abadan, Kharg, Farabi, Bandar Imam, complementary phase of Shiraz and Iran-Carbon of Ahwaz petrochemical units were put into operation in that year.

Prior to the Iranian revolution, the first major petrochemical operation in Iran was the Shiraz Petrochemical Complex which by 1979 would have had facilities that would have increased annual production capacity of urea by 500,000 tons, nitric acid by 200,000 tons and ammonia nitrate by 250,000 tons, while the largest petrochemical plant in Iran prior to the revolution was the Abadan Petrochemical Plant which by 1976 produced in excess of 100,000 tons of PVC, 12,000 tons of dodecylbenzene and 24,000 tons of sodium hydroxide. Iran had surpassed a production of 5 million tons of hydrocarbon energy, worth billions to the Iranian economy and employing tens of thousands of domestic and foreign workers. The Iranian government in 1977 estimated that by 1985 Iran would supply 10% of the entire world's petrochemical production.

Other large ventures planned prior to the revolution included a second trans Iranian-Soviet pipeline for natural gas named Igat-2 valued at 2 billion, an addition of a methanol production facility at the Kharg Petrochemical Plant (a joint venture with Amoco) known for producing over 250,000 tons of sulfur a year and the Iran Carbon Company (a joint venture with the Cabot Corporation) the largest black carbon and rubber producer in the Middle East.

The largest petrochemical and fertilizer plant in the world, a joint venture between the government of Iran and Japanese conglomerate Mitsui was to be constructed in the city of Bandar e-Shahpur, alongside the Persian Gulf. By 1979 the complex was half completed and was slated at a cost of US$3.2 billion (1979 dollars). The plant manager was to be M. Arvin who formerly managed the Shiraz and Abadan plants.

Due to getting involved in imposed war, Iran oil industry development experienced the lowest growth rate from 1979 till 1989. In 1989 the country petrochemical products reached 2.4 million tons a year.

Since 1989 till 1999 petrochemical industry started to reconstruct and revitalize. Isfahan, Arak, Khorasan, Orumiyeh and Tabriz Petrochemical complexes were constructed and Bandar Imam Petrochemical Complex was also developed. This happened at the end of Country Second Development Plan (1996-2001) and country petrochemical products surpassed 12 million tons per year.

The fourth period (2006–2011) – called stabilizing and sudden growth period – started in 1999 and has been continued till now. The number of petrochemical facilities rose to 39 in the post-Islamic Revolution era from only 6 in 1978, raising the output to 15.8 million tons in 2005 and more than 40 million tons in 2010.

Production sites at Nouri (Borzouyeh), Pars, Jam, Zagros, Pardis, and Mehr produce petrochemical and polymer products.

In 2016, Iran's petrochemical industry experienced at least 15 accidents, possibly linked to cyber-attacks.

Main activities

NPC's major activities are production, sale, distribution and export of chemicals and petrochemicals. Currently allied with 56 subsidiaries, including 9 production complexes and 18 project implementing companies, NPC operates as a mother company handling policy-making, planning, directing and overseeing the activities of its subsidiaries and affiliates.

As at end of 2009, Iran's total annual petrochemical production capacity stood at 34 million tonnes. In 2010, Iran produced 26% of the total petrochemical output in the Middle East, second behind Saudi Arabia. The petrochemical industry accounts for 2 percent of the GDP, 44 percent of the non-oil exports and 55 percent of the industrial exports. In 2011, Iran earned 12 billion dollars from exporting petrochemical products to over 60 countries. The petrochemical industry accounts for 2 percent of the GDP, 44 percent of the non-oil exports and 55 percent of the industrial exports.

The focus over the past few years has been on products which use natural gas as feedstock; in particular, methanol, ethylene, propane and butane. This is because the profit margins for crude oil and naphtha-consuming petrochemicals are continuously eroding due to the competitiveness of the market and the high price of feedstock.

Main products

Iran has a diversified petroleum product basket with more than 70 products. The main exports are polyethylene, methanol, benzene, ammonia, sulphur, PVC and propylene. Iran exported $8.613 billion worth of different types of petrochemical products in Iranian year 2010-2011.

Methanol: Iran is a key player in supplying the world's methanol demand. Currently, Iran has the capacity to produce more than 5 million tonnes of methanol, which constitutes 10% of the world's methanol production. Of this amount, approximately 90% is exported.

Ethane: In addition, Iran has a competitive advantage in the gas consuming stream of the petrochemical industry due to its vast reserves of natural gas. In the Assalouyeh region near the South Pars gas field in the Persian Gulf, Iran is able to convert raw gas to ethane (a raw material for the petrochemical industry) and then to petrochemical products at a gross margin of up to 88%. In 2009, Iran consumed domestically over 95% of the natural gas that was produced.

Expansion of the petrochemical industry

In 1989 the Planning and Development Department of NPC initiated, with the help of other related institutions and individuals, a long-term study on the "Strategic Plan for the Development of the Petrochemical Industry in Iran". Considering national and international factors such as the local market, export potentials, feedstock availability and profitability, a 25-year development plan, consisting of five development phases, was drawn up.

Business Monitor International (BMI) estimates that in 2009, Iranian petrochemicals exports will be around $7.9 billion, 32 percent above the previous year. Iran hopes to implement 47 new petrochemical projects by the end of the Fifth Five-Year Economic Development Plan in 2015 at a cost of $25 billion, adding a total of 43 million tons per annum (tpa) to the capacity. Iran will represent at least 5.3 percent of global petrochemical output and 36 percent of Middle Eastern production once those projects become online. The Ministry of Petroleum of Iran has set targets for annual production of 11.5 million tpa of ethylene, 11.5 million tpa of polymer and 3.4 million tpa of urea, with a target of becoming the world's leading producer of methanol with 7.5 million tpa of methanol capacity, which represents 18 percent of global capacity.

Iran National Petrochemical Company's output capacity will increase to over 100 million tpa by 2015 from an estimated 50 million tpa in 2010 thus becoming the world' second largest chemical producer globally after Dow Chemical with Iran housing some of the world's largest chemical complexes. 50 billion dollars will be invested during the fifth five-year development plan (2011–2016) to create this new capacity.

Projects due to be completed by 2016, such as the 14th olefins complex in Firouzabad with 1mn tpa ethylene capacity, the 15th olefins complex in Genaveh with 500,000tpa of ethylene and the 17th olefins complex in Ilam with 607,000tpa of ethylene, were significantly delayed under the sanctions regime. Meanwhile, the 12th olefins complex has been postponed and will be configured. However, the 16th olefins and methanol complex is already being constructed by Bushehr Petrochemical Company as part of phase two of the Pars SEZ at Assaluyeh. Completion of the plants, with capacity for 1mn tpa ethylene and 1.65mn tpa methanol, is due in 2014, although past experience has shown that delays could push commercial production back.

Research and development

There are essentially four locations where R&D in the area of petrochemicals are
conducted:
 Universities;
 Research Institute of Petroleum Industry (RIPI);
 The Petrochemical Research and Technology Company;
 R&D departments internal to the petrochemical complexes.

NPC is investing more on its R&D activities: this includes carrying out joint research projects with local institutions and universities; systematic link with local and foreign research centers; and design and operation of pilot plants for research purposes. As at 2011, Iran is highly dependent on foreign expertise in the petrochemical sector, Germany holds a 35 per cent share in Iran's petrochemical production (i.e. licenses). UK, France and the Netherlands rank the next with 18 per cent share, 12 per cent share and 11 per cent share, respectively. Iran has since embarked on domesticating some of those technologies such as naphtha isomerization, thus eliminating the need for purchasing the license from Western countries within the next 5 years.

As at 2012, self-sufficiency in manufacturing and repairing rotating equipment and providing catalysts are the main challenges of the petrochemical industry in Iran. Domestic production of 52 petrochemical catalysts will be started in 2013 onward. 70 percent of the equipment used in the petrochemical sector is produced by domestic manufacturers. In 2015, Iran reported the know-how and domestic production of more than 25 catalysts. Iran's Petrochemical Research and Technology Company also unveiled indigenized reverse osmosis water desalination technology.

Privatization

Local and foreign, is essential for sustained growth of the petrochemical industry in Iran. Policies for encouragement of private sector participation include allocating NPC shares to private sector both inside and outside of Iran; supporting local private sector investments in the petrochemical industry; supporting local engineering firms and production companies; allocating parts of engineering, and most of construction jobs, to the local private sector; and allowing the private sector to invest in new projects in the petrochemical industry.

NPC plans to privatize 17 subsidiary companies by the end of 2007. All shares of domestic petrochemical firms will be offered to the public in the frame of a holding company by the end of 2010. The petrochemical industry is also a key industry on the privatization list. At least 5 more petrochemical companies are expected to undergo privatization over the next 3 years.

Feedstock price

For several years, Iranian petrochemical companies have enjoyed significant discounts from the government on their natural gas feedstock, in comparison to global prices. Even with the partial removal of governmental subsidies on natural gas as part of the economic reform plan, these companies remain highly profitable and retain their global competitive advantage.

According to the 2010 Iranian Economic Reform Plan, by 2015, petrochemical companies, which use natural gas as their feedstock (rather than fuel), will pay no more than 65% of the average export price (rather than 75% charged to the general population) for a period of 10 years.

Similarly, petrochemical companies which use crude oil as their feedstock pay 90% of the market price despite being already highly profitable. It is estimated that only five percent of hydrocarbon products are delivered to petrochemical companies and transformed to value-added products.

NPC affiliate companies

As at 2012, Parsian is the largest listed holding company of petrochemicals in Iran and controls the world's largest producer of methanol (Zagros Petrochemical) and the world's largest producer of urea (Pardis Petrochemical).

Foreign investment

In accordance with the government policy on rapid development of the petrochemical industry, many steps have been taken to make foreign investments in this industry more attractive for our future joint-venture partners. Such actions include creation of special industrial economic zones, revision of legal to taxes and tariffs, guarantee of capital and profit transfer, and providing the required utilities and the needed infrastructure for industrial and commercial operations. The availability of a highly trained but inexpensive work-force, cheap feedstocks and a sizable internal market, will also work in Iran's favor, to attract foreign investment. In 2008, Iran agreed to invest $125 million in the Philippines’ petrochemical market.

Special industrial economic zones

To provide a suitable environment for attraction of foreign and local investments in the petrochemical industry, NPC has made a great effort to develop two special economic zones, one in Bandar Imam in the town of Mahshahr called "Petrochemical Special Economic Zone (Petzone)" and the other in Assaluyeh named "Pars Special Economic/Energy Zone (PSEEZ)". Lavan Island is to become Iran's third petrochemical hub because of its large gas reserves.

As of 2010, the most important Petrochemical projects in the Pars Special Economic Energy Zone are: 9th Olefin, 10th Olefin, 4th Methanol, 4th Urea and Ammonia, Ethane recovery, Styrene Monomer and Polystyrene, Petrochemical Port, centralized utilities, 6th Methanol and DME.
11th Olefin, 12th Olefin, 6th Urea and Ammonia, 8th Urea and Ammonia and HDP Assaluyeh.

Petrochemical Exporting Countries Forum (PECF)

Iran has proposed the creation of a Petrochemical Exporting Countries Forum (PECF) which aims at financial and technological cooperation among members, as well as product pricing and policy making in production issues. According to the Managing Director of the National Petrochemical Company (NPC), Abdolhossein Bayat, Iran, Saudi Arabia, UAE, Russia, Qatar, and Turkey are potential members of PECF.

See also

List of Iranian Research Centers (Polymers)
The nationalization of the Iran oil industry movement

References

External links

Manufacturing companies based in Tehran
Petrochemical companies
Iranian brands
Iranian entities subject to the U.S. Department of the Treasury sanctions